Boxing at the 2006 Asian Games took place in the Academy for Sports Excellence (ASPIRE) in Sports City, 8 kilometers to the west of Doha. The event was only open to men in eleven weight classes, and the bouts were contested over four rounds of two minutes each.

Asian Games Boxing is governed by the rules and regulations set by the amateur International Boxing Association (AIBA).

Schedule

Medalists

Medal table

Participating nations
A total of 192 athletes from 32 nations competed in boxing at the 2006 Asian Games:

References

External links
Official website

 
2006
2006 Asian Games events
Asian Games
Boxing competitions in Qatar